Pir Eshkaft may refer to:
 Pir Eshkaft, Boyer-Ahmad
 Pir Eshkaft, Dana